Washington Luiz will be a monorail station of Line 17-Gold of ViaMobilidade, which is currently under construction, and will connect Line 9-Emerald to Congonhas Airport.

Jardim Aeroporto station will be located in the crossing of Avenida Jornalista Roberto Marinho with Avenida Washington Luís.

Initially, in the São Paulo Metro expansion plans, Line 17-Gold should be open until 2014, connecting with São Paulo–Morumbi station of Line 4-Yellow, at the time that Morumbi Stadium was considered one of the hosts for 2014 FIFA World Cup.

After that, the promise of opening of the line was delayed to 2016, end of 2017, 2018, December 2020, mid of 2021, and, currently, to 2nd semester of 2022.

Station layout

References

São Paulo Metro stations
Proposed railway stations in Brazil
Railway stations scheduled to open in 2024